The First Stage of the 2010 Copa Santander Libertadores de América was run from January 26 to February 10.

Matches

Match G1

Deportivo Táchira and Libertad tied 3–3 on points. Libertad advanced on goal difference.

Match G2

Juan Aurich advanced on points 6–0.

Match G3

Colón and Universidad Católica tied 3–3 on points, 0–0 on goal difference, and 2–2 on away goals. Universidad Católica advanced on penalties 5–3.

Match G4

Cruzeiro advanced on points 4–1.

Match G5

Emelec advanced 4–1 on points.

Match G6

Racing advanced on points 4−1.

External links
Matches

1